Forever Free is the eleventh studio album by heavy metal band Saxon released in 1992.

A UK version of the album features a cover of a biker Space Marine from the Warhammer 40,000 tabletop wargame.

In 2013, Demon Music Group reissued the album digitally and on CD in the UK. This version included two bonus tracks taken from their 1996 double live album, The Eagle Has Landed – Part II. It's the last album with Graham Oliver

Track listing

Personnel
 Saxon
 Biff Byford - vocals
 Paul Quinn - guitar
 Graham Oliver - guitar
 Nibbs Carter - bass guitar
 Nigel Glockler - drums

 Additional musicians
 Gigi Skokan, Nasco - programming, keyboards

 Production
 Biff Byford - producer
 Herwig Ursin - producer
  Austrian producer and engineer, in the late 1980s employed at Powersound Factory, Achau.

 Rainer Hänsel - audio engineer
 Hey You Studios, Vienna - recording location
 Gems Studios Boston, Lincolnshire, England - recording location
 Mastered at Hey You Production, L.A. Studio City, Blairwoodroad - mastering location

Charts

References

Saxon (band) albums
1992 albums
Virgin Records albums